Sospetti is an Italian television series.

Cast
Sebastiano Somma: Luca Bartoli 
Isabella Ferrari: Serena Arcalli 
Irene Ferri: Monica Ramondini 
Romina Mondello: Chiara Colizzi 
Vanessa Gravina: Simona Federici 
Simona Cavallari: Manuela Colizzi Cosentino 
Christiane Filangieri: Elena e Mara Volpi 
Remo Girone: Avv. Villani; Mr. X
Orso Maria Guerrini: Proc. Capo Montanari 
Luca Lionello: Avv. Giacomo Marzi 
Rodolfo Bigotti: Riccardo Valeri 
Antonia Liskova: Yrina Fischer 
Gianni Garko: Martin Fischer 
Toni Bertorelli: Proc. Capo Riva 
Maurizio Aiello: Commissario Magnani
Stefano Molinari: Procuratore Roggi 
Franco Castellano: Michele Sacerdoti 
Fiorenza Marchegiani: Avv. Elena Davino 
Giorgio Lupano: Umberto Arcalli 
Violante Placido: Anna Giusti 
Mirko Casaburo: Matteo Cosentino 
Tiziana Sensi: Adriana 
Caterina Vertova: Luisa Arcalli

See also
List of Italian television series

External links
 
 
 

Italian television series
RAI original programming

Italian legal television series